Samuel Driver may refer to:

 Samuel Rolles Driver (1846–1914), English divine and Hebrew scholar
 Samuel Marion Driver (1892–1958), United States Federal Judge